Paul Boyle (born 14 January 1997) is an Irish rugby union player for Pro14 and European Rugby Challenge Cup side Connacht. He can play across the back-row.

Early life
Boyle was born in Dublin South.

He first began playing rugby at age 7 with Gorey RFC.

Boyle came through the underage ranks for Leinster and was a member of their sub-academy, whilst also playing club rugby with Lansdowne in the All-Ireland League, but was never offered a place in Leinster’s full academy.

Professional
Boyle joined Connacht's academy ahead of the 2017–18 season. He made his senior Connacht debut in January 2018 against provincial rivals Munster. Boyle's performances for Connacht during the early months of the 2018–19 season saw him rewarded with his first professional contract with the province, which led to him graduating from year two of the academy and join the senior squad until at least June 2021.

Ireland
Boyle captained Ireland under-20s at the 2017 World Rugby Under 20 Championship, where they finished ninth overall. In June 2021 he was called up to the senior Ireland squad for the Summer tests. Boyle made his debut off the bench for the Ireland senior side, in a 71–10 victory over the United States on 10 July 2021.

References

External links
Connacht Profile
URC Profile

ItsRugby Profile & Stats

Living people
1997 births
Rugby union players from County Wexford
Irish rugby union players
Lansdowne Football Club players
Connacht Rugby players
Rugby union number eights
Rugby union flankers
Ireland international rugby union players
Leinster Rugby players